The following is a list of sports venues with sole naming rights:

Present naming rights

Australia
In Australia, the most important distinction regarding outdoor stadiums is the shape of their fields:
 Oval stadiums — Generally used for cricket and Australian rules football. Can be used for rectangular-field sports, but seating arrangement is not necessarily optimal.
 Rectangular stadiums — Used for the rugby codes and soccer, and generally cannot be used for oval-field sports.
A few stadiums with oval fields have movable seating that can readily accommodate rectangular-field sports.

Austria

Belgium

Brazil

Canada
In accord with Canadian English usage, "football" refers to Canadian football unless otherwise indicated, and association football is called "soccer".

Chile

China

Cook Islands

Czech Republic

Denmark

Ecuador

Estonia

Finland

France

Germany

Greece

Guatemala

Indonesia

Israel

Italy

Japan

Lithuania

Mexico

Netherlands

New Zealand

Norway

Pakistan

Philippines

Poland

Republic of Ireland

Russia

Serbia

Slovakia

South Africa
Outdoor stadiums are listed by their primary sport. Many stadiums regularly host matches in sports other than their primary ones; this is especially true with regard to stadiums hosting rugby union and football (soccer).

Spain

Sweden

Switzerland

Turkey

United Kingdom

England
Each outdoor stadium is listed by the sports or football codes that primarily use it. "Football" here refers to association football. Many stadiums are occasionally used to host matches in codes other than their primary ones.

Scotland

Wales

United States
Stadiums are listed by their primary use; many stadiums will host events in other sports. In accordance with American English usage, "football" refers specifically to American football, and association football is called "soccer".

Notes

Historical naming rights
3Com Park, formerly Candlestick Park, later Monster Park
95KGGO Arena, now Buccaneer Arena
The 96.6 TFM Darlington Arena, now the Balfour Webnet Darlington Arena
A1 Ring, now Red Bull Ring
AAMI Stadium, now called Football Park
ABSA Stadium (East London, South Africa), reverted to original name of Buffalo City Stadium
Acer Arena, now Allphones Arena
Adelphia Coliseum, later LP Field, now Nissan Stadium
Air Canada Centre, now Scotiabank Arena
Alliant Energy Field, now NelsonCorp Field
Allianz Park, originally Barnet Copthall (current nonsponsored name), now StoneX Stadium
Alltel Arena, later Verizon Arena, now Simmons Bank Arena
Alltel Center, originally Midwest Wireless Civic Center, now Verizon Wireless Center
Alltel Stadium, later EverBank Field, now TIAA Bank Field
America West Arena, later U.S. Airways Center, Talking Stick Resort Arena, and PHX Arena (nonsponsored), now Footprint Center
Ameriquest Field in Arlington, originally The Ballpark in Arlington, now Globe Life Park in Arlington
AOL Arena, originally Volksparkstadion (nonsponsored name), later HSH Nordbank Arena, now Imtech Arena
Applebee's Park, now Whitaker Bank Ballpark
ARCO Arena, later Power Balance Pavilion, now Sleep Train Arena
Arm & Hammer Park, now called the Trenton Thunder Ballpark
Arrowhead Pond of Anaheim, now Honda Center
Ashford University Field, now NelsonCorp Field
AT&T Park, formerly Pacific Bell Park and SBC Park, now Oracle Park
Ausgrid Stadium, originally Newcastle International Sports Centre (nonsponsored name), then Marathon Stadium and EnergyAustralia Stadium; now Hunter Stadium (named after its region, not a company)
Auto Club Speedway, now the California Speedway
Avaya Stadium, now Earthquakes Stadium (nonsponsored)
AXA Arena, originally Letná Stadium (nonsponsored name), then Toyota Arena; now Generali Arena
BankAtlantic Center, formerly National Car Rental Center and Office Depot Center; now BB&T Center
Bankers Life Fieldhouse, now Gainbridge Fieldhouse
Bank of America Centre, now Qwest Arena
Bank One Ballpark, now Chase Field
BankUnited Center, originally University of Miami Convocation Center (nonsponsored), now Watsco Center
BB&T Arena, now Truist Arena
BB&T Center, now the non-sponsored FLA Live Arena
BB&T Ballpark (Charlotte), now Truist Field
BB&T Ballpark (Winston-Salem), now Truist Stadium
BB&T Point, now Truist Point
BBVA Compass Field, later BBVA Field (change due to rebranding by naming rights holder), now PNC Field
BBVA Compass Stadium, later BBVA Stadium (change due to rebranding by naming rights holder), now PNC Stadium
Blundstone Arena, now the Bellerive Oval
BellSouth Park, now AT&T Field
Bendigo Bank Stadium, now Rushton Park named after
Bi-Lo Center, now Bon Secours Wellness Arena
BlueChip Stadium, reverted to original name of Baypark Stadium
 Bright House Networks Stadium, later Spectrum Stadium and the non-sponsored Bounce House, now FBC Mortgage Stadium
Brownes Stadium, now Lathlain Park
Canadian Airlines Saddledome, formerly the Olympic Saddledome, later Pengrowth Saddledome, now Scotiabank Saddledome
Canwest Global Park, later Canwest Park (corporate rebranding), now Shaw Park
Canwest Park, originally Canwest Global Park, now Shaw Park
Carrier Dome, now JMA Wireless Dome
Causeway Stadium, reverted to original name of Adams Park
CenturyLink Arena Boise, originally Bank of America Centre, now Idaho Central Arena
CenturyLink Center (Bossier City), previously Bossier City Arena and CenturyTel Center; now Brookshire Grocery Arena
CenturyLink Center Omaha, originally Qwest Center Omaha, now CHI Health Center Omaha
CenturyLink Field, originally Qwest Field, now Lumen Field (latest name change due to rebranding by the naming rights holder)
CenturyTel Center, originally Bossier City Arena, later CenturyLink Center; now Brookshire Grocery Arena
Cestrian Trading Stadium, originally Deva Stadium (current nonsponsored name) and then Saunders Honda Stadium; now Exacta Stadium
CFE Arena, originally UCF Arena (nonsponsored), now Addition Financial Arena
Champion Window Field, later UC Health Stadium and the non-sponsored Y'alls Ballpark; now Thomas More Stadium
Chevrolet Centre, now Covelli Centre
, originally Chiba Park Dome; was to be named after the company who financed its construction in December 2020 whilst still under construction. Became Tipstar Dome Chiba on its first day of opening less than a year later.
City Mazda Stadium, now Richmond Oval
CMGI Field, now Gillette Stadium
Coca-Cola Stadium, now Shaanxi Province Stadium
Colonial Center, now Colonial Life Arena (change due to rebranding by naming rights holder)
Colonial Stadium, later Telstra Dome and Etihad Stadium, now Marvel Stadium
Comcast Center (College Park, Maryland), now Xfinity Center (change due to rebranding by naming rights holder)
Compaq Center at San Jose, originally San Jose Arena, later HP Pavilion at San Jose, now SAP Center at San Jose
Compaq Center, closed in 2003 and became the main building for Lakewood Church
Conseco Fieldhouse, now Gainbridge Fieldhouse
Consol Energy Center, now PPG Paints Arena
Continental Airlines Arena, formerly Brendan Byrne/Meadowlands Arena, later Izod Center, now reverted to Meadowlands Arena
Coors Events Center, reverted to original nonsponsored name of CU Events Center
Corel Centre, formerly the Palladium, later Scotiabank Place, now Canadian Tire Centre
CoreStates Center, now known as the Wells Fargo Center (formerly First Union Center & Wachovia Center)
Cox Arena, now Viejas Arena
Cox Convention Center, now Prairie Surf Studios
Cricket Arena, originally Charlotte Coliseum, later Independence Arena (after the since-demolished Charlotte Coliseum opened in 1988), now Bojangles' Coliseum
DatchForum, formerly Forum di Assago (nonsponsored name) and Fila Forum, now Mediolanum Forum
Delta Center, later EnergySolutions Arena, now Vivint Smart Home Arena
Dodge Arena, now State Farm Arena (Hidalgo, Texas)
Domain Stadium, now Subiaco Oval
Dreamstyle Arena, formerly University Arena (nonsponsored) and WisePies Arena, now reverted to its longstanding nickname of The Pit
Dreamstyle Stadium now University Stadium
Dr Pepper Ballpark is now Riders Field (nonsponsored)
Du Maurier Stadium, later Stade Uniprix, now Stade IGA
Dunkin' Donuts Center, originally Providence Civic Center (nonsponsored), now Amica Mutual Pavilion
Dunkin' Donuts Park, now Dunkin' Park
Dunn Tire Park, formerly Pilot Field and North AmeriCare Park, later Coca-Cola Field, now Sahlen Field
Edison International Field of Anaheim, formerly Anaheim Stadium, now Angel Stadium of Anaheim
EnergyAustralia Stadium, originally Newcastle International Sports Centre (nonsponsored name), then Marathon Stadium; later Ausgrid Stadium, and now Hunter Stadium (named after its region, not a company)
Enron Field, now Minute Maid Park
Ericsson Stadium (New Zealand), reverted to original name of Mt Smart Stadium
Ericsson Stadium (North Carolina), formerly Carolinas Stadium, now Bank of America Stadium
Edward Jones Dome, formerly the Trans World Dome, now the Dome at America's Center (nonsponsored)
Etihad Stadium (Melbourne), previously Colonial Stadium and Telstra Dome, now Marvel Stadium
EverBank Field, formerly Alltel Stadium, now TIAA Bank Field
Fila Forum, originally Forum di Assago (nonsponsored name), later DatchForum, now Mediolanum Forum
FirstEnergy Park, formerly GPU Energy Park, now ShoreTown Ballpark (nonsponsored)
First Horizon Park, now First National Bank Field
First Niagara Center, known as Crossroads Arena during planning; opened as Marine Midland Arena; then became HSBC Arena; now KeyBank Center
First Union Arena, originally Northeastern Pennsylvania Civic Arena and Convention Center; later Wachovia Arena at Casey Plaza and now Mohegan Sun Arena at Casey Plaza
First Union Center, formerly CoreStates Center, later Wachovia Center, now Wells Fargo Center
FleetCenter, formerly Shawmut Center, later TD Banknorth Garden, now TD Garden
Ford Center, later Oklahoma City Arena, now Chesapeake Energy Arena
Franklin Covey Field, later Spring Mobile Ballpark, now Smith's Ballpark
Friends Provident St Mary's Stadium, now St Mary's Stadium
Fullcast Stadium Miyagi, now Kleenex Stadium Miyagi
Gaylord Entertainment Center, reverted to original name of Nashville Arena, later Sommet Center, now Bridgestone Arena
Goodwill Dome, formerly Seibu Dome and Invoice Seibu Dome, now once again Seibu Dome
Goodyear Park, originally Springbok Park (current nonsponsored name), now OUTsurance Oval
Goodyear Thunderdome, reverted to its sponsorless name of Calder Park Raceway
Great Western Forum, reverted to original name of The Forum (no longer regularly used as a pro sports venue)
Growthpoint Kings Park Stadium, now Jonsson Kings Park Stadium
 Heinz Field, now Acrisure Stadium
Hershey Centre, now Paramount Fine Foods Centre
High Point Solutions Stadium, later HighPoint.com Stadium (change due to rebranding by naming rights holder), now SHI Stadium
HighPoint.com Stadium, previously High Point Solutions Stadium, now SHI Stadium
Hisense Arena, now John Cain Arena
The Home Depot Center, later StubHub Center, now Dignity Health Sports Park
HP Pavilion at San Jose, originally San Jose Arena, formerly Compaq Center at San Jose, now SAP Center at San Jose
HSBC Arena, known as Crossroads Arena during planning; opened as Marine Midland Arena, later First Niagara Center, now KeyBank Center
HSH Nordbank Arena, originally Volksparkstadion (nonsponsored name) and then AOL Arena, now Imtech Arena
Hunter Stadium, now Newcastle International Sports Centre
Invesco Field at Mile High, later Sports Authority Field at Mile High, reverted to Broncos Stadium at Mile High, now Empower Field at Mile High
Investors Group Field, now IG Field (change due to rebranding by naming rights holder)
Invoice Seibu Dome, originally Seibu Dome, later Goodwill Dome, now once again Seibu Dome
iPayOne Center, reverted to original name of San Diego Sports Arena; later Valley View Casino Center and now Pechanga Arena
ITM Stadium, originally Okara Park (current nonsponsored name), now Homeworld Stadium
iWireless Center, originally The MARK of the Quad Cities, now TaxSlayer Center
JJB Stadium, now DW Stadium
Jones SBC Stadium, formerly Clifford B. and Audrey Jones Stadium, now Jones AT&T Stadium
KeySpan Park, later MCU Park, now Maimonides Park
KitKat Crescent, now reverted to Bootham Crescent
Kombank Arena, originally Belgrade Arena, now Štark Arena
Kyocera Arena, reverted to original name of Arena da Baixada
LG Arena, now Genting Arena
Land Shark Stadium, originally Joe Robbie Stadium; later  Pro Player Park, Pro Player Stadium, Dolphins Stadium, Dolphin Stadium, and Sun Life Stadium; now Hard Rock Stadium
Liberty Bank Stadium, originally Indian Stadium and ASU Stadium (neither sponsored), now Centennial Bank Stadium
Lowe's Motor Speedway, reverted to original name of Charlotte Motor Speedway
LTU Arena, now Esprit Arena
Marathon Stadium, originally Newcastle International Sports Centre (nonsponsored name), later EnergyAustralia Stadium and Ausgrid Stadium, and now Hunter Stadium (named after its region, not a company)
McAfee Coliseum, Oakland, California, formerly Oakland–Alameda County Coliseum and Network Associates Coliseum, later reverted to Oakland–Alameda County Coliseum, briefly called Overstock.com Coliseum, later O.co Coliseum, reverted again to Oakland–Alameda County Coliseum, still later RingCentral Coliseum, now reverted to original name
Malanda Stadium, formerly Willows Sports Complex (nonsponsored name) and Stockland Stadium, now Dairy Farmers Stadium
Mapfre Stadium, now Historic Crew Stadium
Marina Auto Stadium, originally PAETEC Park and briefly reverted to Rochester Rhinos Stadium, later Sahlen's Stadium
Marine Midland Arena, known as Crossroads Arena during planning; later HSBC Arena and First Niagara Center, now KeyBank Center
Maxwell Field at Verizon Wireless Stadium, originally Maxwell Field at Midwest Wireless Stadium, later Maxwell Field at Alltel Stadium, now Maxwell Field at Warrior Stadium
Mazda Raceway Laguna Seca, now WeatherTech Raceway Laguna Seca
MCI Center, later Verizon Center, now Capital One Arena
Medibank Stadium , now Leederville Oval
Mercedes-Benz Superdome, originally Louisiana Superdome (nonsponsored), now Caesars Superdome
Midwest Wireless Civic Center, later Alltel Center, now Verizon Wireless Center
Miller Park, now American Family Field
Minolta Loftus, originally Loftus Versfeld Stadium, later Securicor Loftus, now once again Loftus Versfeld Stadium
Mobil Park, now Falcons Park
Molson Centre, now Bell Centre
Monster Park, formerly Candlestick Park and 3Com Park, completed its existence as Candlestick Park
MTS Centre, later Bell MTS Place, now Canada Life Centre
National Car Rental Center, formerly Broward County Civic Arena, later BankAtlantic Center and now BB&T Center
Network Associates Coliseum, formerly Oakland–Alameda County Coliseum, later McAfee Coliseum, once again Oakland–Alameda County Coliseum, briefly Overstock.com Coliseum, later O.co Coliseum; reverted again to Oakland–Alameda County Coliseum, now RingCentral Coliseum (with a brief reversion to the original name)
New Era Field, originally Rich Stadium and later Ralph Wilson Stadium (nonsponsored); still later Bills Stadium and now Highmark Stadium
North AmeriCare Park, formerly Pilot Field, later Dunn Tire Park and Coca-Cola Field, now Sahlen Field
Northeast Delta Dental Stadium, originally Fisher Cats Ballpark (nonsponsored), later Merchantsauto.com Stadium, now Delta Dental Stadium
Office Depot Center, formerly National Car Rental Center, later BankAtlantic Center, now BB&T Center
OKI Jubilee Stadium, formerly Kogarah Oval (nonsponsored name), now WIN Jubilee Oval
Oracle Arena, now Oakland Arena
Estadio Omnilife, later the nonsponsored Estadio Chivas, now Estadio Akron
O'Reilly's Raceway Park at Indianapolis, originally Indianapolis Raceway Park (nonsponsored name), now Lucas Oil Raceway at Indianapolis
Overstock.com Coliseum, originally Oakland–Alameda County Coliseum, then Network Associates Coliseum and McAfee Coliseum before reverting to Oakland–Alameda County Coliseum, now RingCentral Coliseum (with a brief reversion to its original name)
P&C Stadium, later Alliance Bank Stadium, now NBT Bank Stadium
Pacific Bell Park, later SBC Park and AT&T Park, now Oracle Park
PAETEC Park, briefly reverted to Rochester Rhinos Stadium, later Marina Auto Stadium, now Sahlen's Stadium
Papa John's Cardinal Stadium, now Cardinal Stadium (nonsponsored)
Pengrowth Saddledome, originally the Olympic Saddledome and Canadian Airlines Saddledome, now the Scotiabank Saddledome
Pepper Stadium, now Penrith Stadium
Pepsi Arena, now Times Union Center
Pepsi Center, now Ball Arena
Philips Arena, now State Farm Arena
Pilot Field, later North AmeriCare Park, Dunn Tire Park, and Coca-Cola Field, now Sahlen Field
Pizza Hut Park, reverted to FC Dallas Stadium, now Toyota Stadium
Power Balance Pavilion, originally ARCO Arena, now Sleep Train Arena
PPL Park, later Talen Energy Stadium, now Subaru Park
Pro Player Stadium, formerly Joe Robbie Stadium, later Dolphins Stadium, Dolphin Stadium, briefly Land Shark Stadium, then Sun Life Stadium, now Hard Rock Stadium
PSINet Stadium, formerly Ravens Stadium, now M&T Bank Stadium
Qualcomm Stadium, first known as San Diego Stadium and later as Jack Murphy Stadium (neither sponsored); closed as SDCCU Stadium
Quicken Loans Arena, originally Gund Arena (non-sponsored), now Rocket Mortgage FieldHouse (due to rights holder's choice to promote one of its other businesses)
Qwest Center (Bossier City, Louisiana), later CenturyLink Center, now Brookshire Grocery Arena
Qwest Center Omaha, later CenturyLink Center Omaha, now CHI Health Center Omaha
Raley Field, now Sutter Health Park
RBC Center, originally Raleigh Sports & Entertainment Arena (nonsponsored), now PNC Arena
Rexall Place, formerly Northlands Coliseum and Skyreach Centre; reverted to Northlands Coliseum (Edmonton, Alberta, Canada)
Rich Stadium, later Ralph Wilson Stadium (nonsponsored name), New Era Field, and Bills Stadium (also nonsponsored; now Highmark Stadium)
Safeco Field, now T-Mobile Park
Savvis Center, formerly Kiel Center (nonsponsored name), later Scottrade Center, now Enterprise Center
Saunders Honda Stadium, originally Deva Stadium (current nonsponsored name), later The Cestrian Trading Stadium, now Exacta Stadium
Sazka Arena, now O2 Arena
SBC Center, now AT&T Center
SBC Park, formerly Pacific Bell Park, later AT&T Park, now Oracle Park
Securicor Loftus, formerly Loftus Versfeld Stadium and Minolta Loftus, now once again Loftus Versfeld Stadium
Security Bank Ballpark, now Momentum Bank Ballpark
Security Service Field, now UCHealth Park
Shawmut Center, later FleetCenter and TD Banknorth Garden, now TD Garden
Sovereign Bank Stadium, later Santander Stadium, then PeoplesBank Park, now WellSpan Park
St. Pete Times Forum, originally Ice Palace (nonsponsored), later Tampa Bay Times Forum (due to name change by naming rights holder), now Amalie Arena
Sommet Center, originally Nashville Arena, then Gaylord Entertainment Center, reverted to Nashville Arena before becoming Sommet Center; now Bridgestone Arena
 Spectrum Stadium, originally Bright House Networks Stadium, later the non-sponsored Bounce House, now FBC Mortgage Stadium
Spirit Communications Park, now Segra Park
Spring Mobile Ballpark, formerly Franklin Covey Field, now Smith's Ballpark
Sprint Center, now T-Mobile Center
State Mutual Stadium, now AdventHealth Stadium
Stockland Stadium, originally Willows Sports Complex (nonsponsored name), later Malanda Stadium, now Dairy Farmers Stadium
Sun Life Stadium, originally Joe Robbie Stadium; later  Pro Player Park, Pro Player Stadium, Dolphins Stadium, Dolphin Stadium, and Land Shark Stadium; now Hard Rock Stadium
SunTrust Park, now Truist Park
Taco Bell Arena, now ExtraMile Arena
Taco John's Events Centerl, now Cheyenne Ice and Events Center
Talen Energy Stadium, originally PPL Park, now Subaru Park
TD Bank Sports Center, now People's United Center
TD Banknorth Garden, previously Shawmut Center and FleetCenter, now TD Garden (latest change due to rebranding by naming rights holder)
TD Waterhouse Centre, now Amway Arena
TD Ameritrade Park Omaha now known as Charles Schwab Field Omaha
TECO Arena, formerly Everblades Arena, now Hertz Arena
Telstra Dome, originally Colonial Stadium, later Etihad Stadium, now Marvel Stadium
Telstra Stadium, formerly Stadium Australia, now ANZ Stadium
Telus Field, Edmonton, Alberta, Canada
The Bank of Kentucky Center, now Truist Arena
TI Circuit Aida, now Okayama International Circuit
Topper Stadium, formerly Breakers Stadium, later reverted to Breakers Stadium, now The Gardens
Toyota Arena (Prague), originally Letná Stadium (nonsponsored name); later AXA Arena, now Generali Arena
Toyota Park, now SeatGeek Stadium
Toyota Speedway at Irwindale, now Irwindale Event Center
Trans World Dome, later Edward Jones Dome, now reverted to The Dome at America's Center (nonsponsored name)
UC Health Stadium, previously Champion Window Field, later the non-sponsored Y'alls Ballpark, now Thomas More Stadium
Uniprix Stadium, previously Du Maurier Stadium, now IGA Stadium
United Spirit Arena, now United Supermarkets Arena (changed when naming rights holder chose to use its corporate name instead of a company slogan)
U.S. Cellular Park, originally (New) Comiskey Park (nonsponsored), now Guaranteed Rate Field
Valley View Casino Center, formerly iPayOne Center, now Pechanga Arena
Verizon Arena, formerly Alltel Arena, now Simmons Bank Arena
Vodafone Arena, later Hisense Arena, now Melbourne Arena
Wachovia Arena at Casey Plaza, originally Northeastern Pennsylvania Civic Arena and Convention Center and then First Union Arena; now Mohegan Sun Arena at Casey Plaza
 Weidner Field, previously Coleman Park, Sand Creek Stadium, and Switchbacks Stadium; now Switchbacks Training Stadium (no other names have been sponsored)
Wachovia Center, originally CoreStates Center and First Union Center, now Wells Fargo Center
Westpac Park, reverted to original name of Seddon Park
Williamson Motors Stadium, formerly the 96.6 TFM Darlington Arena, now the Balfour Webnet Darlington Arena
WisePies Arena, originally University Arena (nonsponsored), later Dreamstyle Arena, now reverted to its longstanding nickname of The Pit
Whitaker Bank Ballpark now Lexington Legends Ballpark
In an unusual situation, The Jungle, a rugby league stadium in Castleford, England, retained its name even after a naming rights contract expired. The occupants of the stadium, the Castleford Tigers, decided it was appropriate to keep the "Jungle" name.

Aborted naming rights deals
At least two venues had naming rights deals in place, but the deals were canceled before the name was ever officially used:
 The University of Missouri announced that its new basketball arena, set to open in 2004, would be named Paige Sports Arena after Paige Laurie, daughter of major donors Bill and Nancy Laurie. However, when it was discovered that Paige had never earned a claimed degree from the University of Southern California, the university and the elder Lauries agreed to remove Paige's name from the venue. The facility opened as, and remains to this day, Mizzou Arena.
 In February 2013, Florida Atlantic University announced that it had sold the naming rights to its football venue, FAU Stadium, to GEO Group, an operator of private prisons. However, the FAU football play-by-play announcer immediately dubbed the venue "Owlcatraz" (a play on the school's nickname and the infamous Alcatraz prison), and several other protests quickly followed. Due to the pressure, the school and company agreed to rescind the naming deal before it ever took effect.
The Los Angeles Memorial Coliseum announced that the naming rights would be sold to United Airlines, renaming the stadium United Airlines Coliseum, however, after major backlash and United not wanting to change the name to anything other than the United Airlines Coliseum, the deal was cancelled and remains as the Los Angeles Memorial Coliseum.
In February 2022, Citypark, home venue of the 2023 Major League Soccer expansion club St. Louis City SC, was named Centene Stadium after the St. Louis-based managed healthcare company Centene Corporation acquired the naming rights. However, in October 2022, Centene pulled out of the 15-year contract before the stadium's opening.

Naming rights for closed venues
 Allianz Stadium – Final sponsored name of the stadium historically known as Sydney Football Stadium; also previously sponsored as Aussie Stadium. Closed in October 2018 and demolished in 2019.
 AMI Stadium in Christchurch, New Zealand – Final sponsored name of the stadium historically known as Lancaster Park; also had a sponsored name of Jade Stadium. Damaged beyond repair in the 2011 Christchurch earthquake and eventually demolished; the AMI Stadium name was transferred to the venue historically known as Rugby League Park.
 Amway Arena in Orlando, Florida, USA (closed September 30, 2010; demolished March 25, 2012)
 BMO Harris Bradley Center in Milwaukee, Wisconsin, USA (closed July 25, 2018; demolished May 31, 2019)
 Busch Memorial Stadium in St. Louis, Missouri, USA (demolished December 8, 2005)
 Busch Stadium (original) in St. Louis, Missouri, USA (demolished 1966)
 Campbell's Field in Camden, New Jersey, USA (demolished December 2018)
 Canad Inns Stadium in Winnipeg, Manitoba, Canada (demolished August 2013)
 Cinergy Field in Cincinnati, Ohio, USA (demolished December 29, 2002)
 Colisée Pepsi in Quebec City, Quebec, Canada (closed September 14, 2015)
 Compaq Center in Houston (closed as a sports facility in December 2003; now the main worship center for Lakewood Church)
 Estadio Corona (original) in Torreón, Coahuila, Mexico (demolished November 2, 2009)
 Houlihan's Stadium in Tampa, Florida, USA (demolished 1999)
 Mazda CP Mine Circuit in Mine, Yamaguchi Prefecture, Japan (closed in February 2006, became a private testing site when it was sold to its sponsor, now Mine Proving Grounds)
 McCain Stadium in Scarborough, England (closed May 2007; still standing, but damaged in an October 2008 fire)
 Mosaic Stadium at Taylor Field in Regina, Saskatchewan, Canada (closed on November 5, 2016; demolished October 27, 2017)
 NRG Astrodome in Houston, Texas, USA (closed 2004)
 RCA Dome in Indianapolis, Indiana, USA (demolished December 20, 2008)
 SDCCU Stadium in San Diego – Final sponsored name of the stadium originally known as San Diego Stadium and later as Jack Murphy Stadium. Sponsored as Qualcomm Stadium from 1997 to 2017. Closed in March 2020 and demolished in 2021.
 Sleep Train Arena in Sacramento, California, USA (closed December 17, 2016)
 US Airways Arena in Landover, Maryland, USA (demolished December 15, 2002)
 Wachovia Spectrum (originally the Spectrum; later sponsored as CoreStates Spectrum and FirstUnion Spectrum) in Philadelphia, Pennsylvania USA (closed October 31, 2009; demolition came in 2011.)
 WesBank Raceway in Germiston, Gauteng, South Africa (closed to be demolished)

Naming rights for venues never built
 Arco Park in Sacramento, California, US (Started construction on foundation in 1989, however, nothing has been constructed besides concrete slabs and remnants still remain today)
Cisco Field in Fremont, California, and later San Jose, California, US (proposed in 2005; proposal abandoned in 2015)
 Farmers Field in Los Angeles, California, US (proposed in 2010; proposal abandoned in 2015)
 Labatt Park in Montreal, Quebec, Canada (proposed in 2000; proposal abandoned in 2002)
 National Car Rental Field in St. Louis, Missouri, US (proposed in 2015; proposal abandoned in 2016 after the NFL's Rams moved back to Los Angeles)

Naming rights for future venues

Opening in 2022
 Snapdragon Stadium in San Diego, California – college football stadium (San Diego State Aztecs football); will also be used for soccer (San Diego Wave FC) and rugby union (San Diego Legion)

Opening in 2023
 ES CON Field Hokkaido in Kitahiroshima, Japan – retractable-roofed baseball park (Hokkaido Nippon-Ham Fighters)
 F&M Bank Arena in Clarksville, Tennessee – multi-purpose indoor arena (Austin Peay Governors basketball)
 Midco Arena in Sioux Falls, South Dakota — hockey-focused indoor arena (Augustana Vikings, NCAA)

Opening in 2024
 Intuit Dome in Inglewood, California — multi-purpose indoor arena (Los Angeles Clippers)

Opening at an undetermined date
 Conoco Stadium in Great Coates, North East Lincolnshire, England, United Kingdom — football (soccer) stadium, Grimsby Town Football Club. Planning permission granted, but no definite date set for construction.

See also
 List of cultural entities with sole naming rights
 List of sports venues named after individuals

References

Lists of stadiums
Lists of sports venues
Naming in sports